The Friday Project was a London-based independent publishing house founded by Paul Carr and Clare Christian in June 2004. It evolved out of The Friday Thing, an Internet newsletter taking an offbeat look at the week's politics, media activities and general current events, originally written together with Charlie Skelton.

The Project was wholly concerned with finding material on the web and then turning it into traditional books, to the exclusion of normal publishing models. Additionally, they made a large amount of their output available free to download as part of the Creative Commons license.

History
In 2006, The Friday Project announced that it had hired Scott Pack, then Buying Manager at bookshop chain Waterstones, as TFP's Commercial Director. Pack took up the post in September 2006 at the end of a six-month notice period. In his job at Waterstones, Pack was once described by a newspaper as being seen by 'many' otherwise unidentified people as 'the most powerful man in the books trade' for his ability to decide which new titles will be successful.

The Friday Project also have an audio arm which is responsible for the CD Fitness to Practice by Amateur Transplants.  The album includes the internet hit  London Underground which has spawned a popular  viral video.

During 2006, The Friday Project's Commercial Director Scott Pack courted controversy with his Me and My Big Mouth blog.  Positioned as an irreverent commentary on the UK book trade it sparked a number of national press stories and was highly critical of lead retailers Waterstones and W H Smith.  He also launched personal attacks on journalists he claimed had reported on his time at Waterstones incorrectly. These included Nick Cohen, Norman Lebrecht and D. J. Taylor.

In December 2006, it was reported that Carr - along with Online Editor, Graham Pond, had left The Friday Project with Carr leading a buy-out of the company's Internet media arm to create a new company, Friday Cities.

In 2007, Clare Christian announced the launch of Friday Fiction, a new imprint for original fiction discovered on the web.

In March 2007 The Friday Project was shortlisted for two industry awards (or Nibbies), one for Innovation in the Book Industry for their commitment to making their books available under a Creative Commons license and Managing Director Clare Christian was shortlisted for a second for the company in the category of UK Young Publisher of the Year.

On 1 May 2007 The Friday Project's Managing Director Clare Christian won the Nibbie for UK Young Publisher of the Year.

Liquidation and sale
Following losses in excess of £1,700,000, the Friday Project went into liquidation on 30 March 2008.

After much speculation, in May 2008 HarperCollins UK bought certain assets of The Friday Project from its administrator, hiring Scott Pack and also Clare Christian (no longer employed by them), and taking on several front and backlist titles; the first title to be published under the new Friday Project imprint was the critically acclaimed novel The State of Me by Nasim Marie Jafry.

Closure 
In 2014, the Bookseller magazine reported that Scott Pack was departing the Friday Project and that the imprint "will now be wound down."

Footnotes

External links
The Friday Project The Friday Project page on Harper Collins' site
The Friday Project 
TFP's Girl Friday (Now closed)
Me and My Big Mouth
The Friday Project Discussion (Now closed)
 The Friday Project articles on the 5th Estate blog

Local mass media in London